Below is the list of the winners at the Malaysia Open in badminton in women's singles.

Between 1942-1946 it was cancelled because of the World War II.
Between 1967-1982 it wasn't competition either.

See Also
 List of Malaysia Open men's singles champions

External links
Malaysia Open - Past Champions women's singles, from InternationalBadminton.org